Serhiy Gonchar (born 3 July 1970) is a Ukrainian former professional road racing cyclist. He won the World Time Trial Championship in 2000.
Due to a temporary spelling error in his passport, he is often incorrectly called Honchar.

Career
Gonchar failed a blood health check in the 1999 Tour de Suisse, and was removed from the race. Even though it was only a health check, and not a doping offence, the Tour de France organisation still decided to ban his  team from the 1999 Tour de France.

In the 2006 Tour de France, Gonchar lead the general classification after a time-trial win in stage 7. In time trialing, Gonchar rocks the top of his body to get the most out of a big gear. He beat Landis, Zabriskie, Lang, Rogers, Klöden, Evans and various others in the individual time trials in the 2006 Tour de France.

On 11 May 2007, Gonchar was suspended for 30 days by his T-Mobile team, following blood tests taken at Liège–Bastogne–Liège and the Tour de Romandie. On 19 June 2007, the T-Mobile team announced the termination of his contract.

When Gonchar was not able to find a new team in 2010, he retired.

Major results

1993
 1st  Overall Okolo Slovenska
1997
 1st Chrono des Herbiers
 1st Stage 5 (ITT) Tour de Suisse
 2nd  Time trial, UCI Road World Championships
 3rd Grand Prix Eddy Merckx
 5th Overall Giro d'Italia
1st Stage 18 (ITT) 
 9th Gran Premio de Llodio
1998
 1st  Time trial, National Road Championships
 1st Chrono des Herbiers
 1st Stage 3b (ITT) Four Days of Dunkirk
 3rd  Time trial, UCI Road World Championships
 7th Overall Ronde van Nederland
1st Stage 3b (ITT) 
 10th Overall Giro d'Italia
1st Stage 21 (ITT)
Held  after Stages 3 & 4
1999
 1st  Overall Ronde van Nederland
1st Stage 3b (ITT)
 1st Chrono des Herbiers
 1st Grand Prix des Nations
 6th Time trial, UCI Road World Championships
 7th Overall Giro d'Italia
1st Stage 18 (ITT)
2000
 1st  Time trial, UCI Road World Championships
 1st  Time trial, National Road Championships
 1st  Overall Settimana Ciclistica Lombarda
1st Stage 2
 2nd Chrono des Herbiers
 4th GP Industria & Artigianato di Larciano
 9th Time trial, Olympic Games
 9th Overall Giro d'Italia
2001
 1st  Time trial, National Road Championships
 1st  Overall Settimana Ciclistica Lombarda
1st Stage 3 
 3rd Overall Ronde van Nederland
1st Stage 3b (ITT)
 3rd Giro dell'Appennino
 3rd Chrono des Herbiers
 4th Overall Giro d'Italia
 4th Giro della Romagna
 4th EnBW Grand Prix (with Denis Zanette)
 5th GP Industria & Artigianato di Larciano
 8th Overall Giro del Trentino
 10th Trofeo Pantalica
2002
 1st  Time trial, National Road Championships
 3rd Overall Setmana Catalana de Ciclisme
 10th Grand Prix Eddy Merckx (with Marco Velo)
2003
 National Road Championships
1st  Road race
2nd Time trial
 3rd Overall Ronde van Nederland
 3rd Grand Prix des Nations
 4th Trofeo Melinda
 4th Gran Premio Bruno Beghelli
 4th Firenze–Pistoia
 7th Overall Giro d'Italia
1st Stage 21 (ITT)
 7th Giro di Lombardia
 8th Overall Danmark Rundt
 9th Overall Three Days of De Panne
2004
 2nd Overall Giro d'Italia
1st Stage 13 (ITT)
 3rd Time trial, National Road Championships
 4th Trofeo Laigueglia
 5th Veenendaal–Veenendaal
2005
 1st Stage 3 Giro del Trentino
 3rd Giro del Veneto
 6th Overall Giro d'Italia
 9th Coppa Placci
2006
 Tour de France
1st Stages 7 (ITT) & 19 (ITT)
Held  after Stages 7–9
 2nd Overall Circuit de la Sarthe
 4th LuK Challenge Chrono (with Michael Rogers)
 Giro d'Italia
Held  after Stages 5 & 7
2008
 2nd Giro del Veneto
 National Road Championships
4th Road race
4th Time trial
2009
 4th Raiffeisen Grand Prix
 10th Gran Premio Città di Camaiore

Grand Tour general classification results timeline

See also
 List of doping cases in cycling

References

External links

1970 births
Living people
Ukrainian male cyclists
Ukrainian Tour de France stage winners
Olympic cyclists of Ukraine
Cyclists at the 2000 Summer Olympics
Cyclists at the 2004 Summer Olympics
UCI Road World Champions (elite men)
Ukrainian Giro d'Italia stage winners
Doping cases in cycling
Sportspeople from Rivne
Tour de Suisse stage winners
Sportspeople from Rivne Oblast